Youstin Delfín Salas Gómez (born 17 June 1996) is a Costa Rican professional footballer who plays as a defensive midfielder for Costa Rican club Deportivo Saprissa and the Costa Rica national team.

International career 
Salas was called up to the final 26-man Costa Rica squad for the 2022 FIFA World Cup in Qatar.

References

External links 
 
 
 

1996 births
Living people
People from Limón Province
Costa Rican footballers
Association football midfielders
Santos de Guápiles footballers
C.S. Herediano footballers
C.F. Universidad de Costa Rica footballers
Municipal Grecia players
Deportivo Saprissa players
Costa Rica youth international footballers
Costa Rica international footballers
2022 FIFA World Cup players